Ulster Tatler is a lifestyle and society magazine based in Belfast, Northern Ireland, which was founded in 1966.

Overview
Established in 1966, the Ulster Tatler is Northern Ireland's longest established monthly. It has coverage of events in the Northern Ireland social calendar as well as local fashions. During the early years of The Troubles, it made of point of never making any comment on the political or social problems of the province; rather it reflected the high society and other social events of the time.

The tone of the magazine is very much to look of the positive side to life in Northern Ireland.

The Ulster Tatler has a readership of 294,000 (Millward Brown Ulster - Magazine Readership Survey 2008, 8 December. Survey amongst 1024 respondents, based on aged 16+ population across Northern Ireland. Magazines read or looked at for a least 2 minutes in last 4 months. 294,000 based on weighting up to 2007 mid year population figures for 16+ population).  It was one of the first magazines in Northern Ireland to join the Audited Bureau of Circulations back in 1995 and has a current ABC figure of 10,866 (Jan-Dec 2008). 
The Ulster Tatler received the IPR magazine of the year 2006/07.

The magazine awards a prize, Ulster Tatler Award.  The winners include Carl Frampton, Christine Bleakley and poet Michael Longley.

References

External links
 Ulster Tatler Magazine website

1966 establishments in Northern Ireland
Weekly magazines published in the United Kingdom
Entertainment magazines published in the United Kingdom
Magazines established in 1966
Magazines published in Northern Ireland
Mass media in Belfast